Küçükyalı is one of the neighborhoods of İstanbul on the Asian side and governed by the Maltepe municipality. The neighborhood is on the coast of the Marmara Sea.

Transport
Metro
M4 Kadıköy-Tavşantepe (extension to Sabiha Gökçen International Airport is under construction)

Populated places in Istanbul Province
Fishing communities in Turkey
Neighbourhoods of Istanbul
Maltepe, Istanbul